Sir Robert Jenkinson, 1st Baronet (1621 – 30 March 1677) was an English politician who sat in the House of Commons  from 1654 to 1659.

Jenkinson was the son of Sir Robert Jenkinson of Walcot, Oxfordshire and his wife Anna-Maria Lee, daughter of Sir Robert Lee of Billeslee. He matriculated at Trinity College, Oxford aged 16 on 16 December 1636 and was called to the bar at Inner Temple in 1649.

In 1654, Jenkinson was elected Member of Parliament for Oxfordshire in the First Protectorate Parliament. He was re-elected MP for Oxfordshire in 1656 for the Second Protectorate Parliament and in 1659 for the Third Protectorate Parliament. He was created baronet on 18 May 1661.
 
Jenkinson died at the age of  56.

Jenkinson married Mary Banks, daughter of Sir John Bankes PC of Kingston Hall, Dorset. He was succeeded in the baronetcy by his son Robert.

References

1621 births
1677 deaths
Baronets in the Baronetage of England
English MPs 1654–1655
English MPs 1656–1658
English MPs 1659
Members of the Inner Temple